Anastásia Olave Solari (born 5 May 1989) is an indoor and field hockey player from Uruguay.

Career

Field hockey
Olave made her debut for Las Cimarronas in 2008, at the South American Championship in Montevideo.

Since her debut, Olave has gone on the represent the national team in multiple major tournaments. In 2018, she won a silver medal with the team at the South American Games in Cochabamba.

In 2019, she was a member of the team at the Pan American Games in Lima.

Indoor
Anastásia Olave made her debut for the Uruguayan indoor team at the 2010 Indoor Pan American Cup, where she won a silver medal.

She went on to represent the team again at the 2011 Indoor World Cup in Poznań.

References

External links

1989 births
Living people
Female field hockey forwards
Uruguayan female field hockey players
Place of birth missing (living people)
South American Games silver medalists for Uruguay
South American Games medalists in field hockey
Competitors at the 2018 South American Games
Pan American Games competitors for Uruguay
Field hockey players at the 2019 Pan American Games